St Mark's Church, Stockland Green is a Church of England parish church in Birmingham.

History

The church originated as Stockland Green mission room from St Barnabas' Church, Erdington in 1908. In 1920 it was dedicated to St Mark, and in 1934 a new church was opened, to the designs of A T Gray. Built of brick, it is a low building with a steeply pitched roof.

In 1934 a parish was assigned with land taken from the parish of All Saints' Church, Gravelly Hill.

References

Church of England church buildings in Birmingham, West Midlands
Churches completed in 1934
1908 establishments in England